Carlo Secillano Favagrossa (22 November 1888 – 22 March 1970), was an Italian general and politician.

During the World War II era, he was the Italian Under-Secretary for War Production. He also participated in the Spanish civil war on the side of Francisco Franco.

Prior to the outbreak of hostilities, Favagrossa had calculated that Italy would not be prepared for war until October 1942.

In 1946 published a book, with the title Perchè perdemmo la guerra (why we lost the war), where he pinpointed the reasons of his calculations.

References

External links
 

Italian people of World War II
1970 deaths
1888 births
20th-century Italian politicians
Mussolini Cabinet